Reji Abraham is the managing director of Aban Group in India. He is on the 2009 Forbes list of the world's wealthiest people. He was listed on the 2008 Forbes list of the world's wealthiest people. He runs India's largest offshore drilling company Aban Offshore. He resides in Chennai. According to Forbes 2008, Abraham was 605 Richest man in the world with an estimated $2 billion fortune. As of 2009, his wealth has decreased to $770 million. His wealth is mainly dependent on the fortunes of his company, Aban Offshore. Aban Offshore's market cap drastically dipped due to the recent prolonged  bear market.

He holds BE and MBA degrees.

History 
Reji Abrahams business empire was begun by late father M.A Abraham in 1986 as a small construction firm. Reji took charge of Aban group in 2004 after his father's death. Under Reji's leadership Aban Group acquired two tranches from a Norwegian company, Sinvest for a sum of $1.3 billion.

References

20th-century births
Living people
Businesspeople from Chennai
Year of birth missing (living people)